James Duff may refer to:

Politicians
Sir James Duff (British Army officer) (1752–1839), British army officer, who fought in the Napoleonic wars and a Member of Parliament
James Grant Duff (1789–1858), Indian soldier and statesman
James Duff (North Norfolk MP) (1831–1878), British MP for North Norfolk
James Stoddart Duff (1856–1916), Canadian politician
James Augustine Duff (1872–1943), Ulster Unionist politician in Northern Ireland
James H. Duff (1883–1969), Pennsylvanian politician
James Duff, 2nd Earl Fife (1729–1809), MP for Banffshire and Elginshire
James Duff, 4th Earl Fife (1776–1857), MP for Banffshire
James Duff, 5th Earl Fife (1814–1879), MP for Banffshire

Others
Sir James Duff, 1st Baronet (died 1815), of the Duff-Gordon baronets
James Duff Duff (1860–1940), English translator and classical scholar
James Fitzjames Duff (1898–1970), British educationalist
James Duff (businessman), American billionaire businessman
James Duff (writer) (born 1955), American screenwriter and playwright
James C. Duff, Director of the Administrative Office of the United States Courts

See also
Jamie Duff (born 1989), Scottish association football player